Olumide Makanjuola (born June 7) is a Nigerian human rights activist, storyteller, LGBTQI advocate,  and social entrepreneur. He was the executive director for The Initiative for Equal Rights (TIERS) and presently the program director for Initiative Sankofa d’Afrique de l’Ouest (ISDAO), a regional activist-led organization supporting an inclusive society free from violence and injustice through funding to local organisations.

In 2016, Makanjuola received a Queen's Young Leader Award for his work within the LGBTI+ community and was the 2012 Future Awards nominee in the Best Use of Advocacy category.  Makanjuola's work has contributed immensely to the advancement of LGBTIQ rights in Nigeria. He is considered a pioneer of many initiatives, and has contributed to shifting public discussion around LGBTIQ rights and issues.

Education 
Makanjuola is a graduate of business management from the Ogun state Institute of Technology, Strategic Project management at Anglia Ruskin University. He holds an introduction project management certificate from City University London.

Activism
Makanjuola co-produced a documentary on what it means to be gay in Nigeria in 2014 just after President Goodluck Jonathan signed the same sex marriage prohibition act into law. Makanjuola also co-produced Veil of Silence, Hell or High Water, Everything in Between, We don't Live here anymore and Walking with Shadows, adapted from Jude Dibia's 2006 book.

Makanjuola joined The Initiative for Equal Rights (TIERs) in October 2006 as a community volunteer and one of the founding members, and grew in rank to become its executive director in September 2012, serving until March 2018 when he stepped down. He has served as an independent expert to the European Asylum Support Office and as a board member at The Equality Hub, a queer women-led organization. He has served as the executive vice-chairman of The Future Project since 2015. In March 2019 he became the program director for Initiative Sankofa d’Afrique de l’Ouest (ISDAO), a West African philanthropic fund that is working to ensure a just and inclusive West Africa free from violence and discrimination.

Awards and recognition 
 2012, Future Award nominee in the Best Use of Advocacy category
 2016, YNaija PowerList for Advocacy
 2016, Queen's Young Leader Award

References 

Living people
Nigerian LGBT people
Nigerian LGBT rights activists
Year of birth missing (living people)